Zaruma Canton is a canton of Ecuador, located in the El Oro Province.  Its capital is the town of Zaruma.  Its population at the 2001 census was 23,407.

Zaruma was named a Pueblo Mágico (magical town) by the Ecuadorian Ministry of Tourism (MINTUR) in 2019. It is one of five communities across the country that inaugurated the programme that year.

Demographics
Ethnic groups as of the Ecuadorian census of 2010:
Mestizo  83.6%
White  7.4%
Montubio  6.6%
Afro-Ecuadorian  2.1%
Indigenous  0.2%
Other  0.2%

References

Cantons of El Oro Province